Yegor Alexandrovich Sharangovich (born 6 June 1998) is a Belarusian professional ice hockey forward for the New Jersey Devils of the National Hockey League (NHL). He was drafted by the Devils, 141st overall, in the 2018 NHL Entry Draft, and made his NHL debut in 2020. Prior to joining the Devils Sharangovich played two seasons with Dinamo Minsk of the Kontinental Hockey League, as well as two seasons in the American Hockey League. Internationally Sharangovich has played for the Belarusian national team at both the junior and senior level, including four World Championships.

Playing career
Sharangovich played as a youth in his native Belarus, with Dinamo-Raubichi Minsk at the under-20 level and also the second tier Vysshaya Liga as an affiliate to top Belarusian club, HC Dinamo Minsk of the Kontinental Hockey League (KHL). His development was noticed in North America, as he was drafted 252nd overall by the Youngstown Phantoms of the 2017 USHL Entry Draft.

Opting to remain in Belarus, Sharangovich made his debut with Dinamo Minsk during the 2017–18 season appearing in 47 games as a rookie, collecting 4 goals and 12 points. After being passed over in previous drafts, Sharangovich was selected as an overage pick by the New Jersey Devils in the fifth-round, 141st overall, of the 2018 NHL Entry Draft.

On 19 July 2018, Sharangovich agreed to a three-year, entry-level contract with the Devils.

With the 2020–21 season to be delayed due to the COVID-19 pandemic, on 16 July 2020, Sharangovich opted to return to Dinamo Minsk on loan from the Devils, and play in the KHL until the resumption of the North American season.

On 16 January 2021, Sharangovich scored his first NHL goal against the Boston Bruins' Jaroslav Halák. The goal was the overtime winner in a 2–1 Devils win. On April 2, 2022, Sharangovich scored his first hat trick against the Florida Panthers.

International play
Sharangovich has played internationally at the junior and senior level for the Belarusian national team. He participated at the 2017 IIHF World Championship and later the 2018 IIHF World Championship.

Career statistics

Regular season and playoffs

International

References

External links
 

1998 births
Living people
Belarusian ice hockey centres
Binghamton Devils players
HC Dinamo Minsk players
New Jersey Devils draft picks
New Jersey Devils players
Ice hockey people from Minsk